Year 116 (CXVI) was a leap year starting on Tuesday (link will display the full calendar) of the Julian calendar. At the time, it was known as the Year of the Consulship of Lamia and Vetus (or, less frequently, year 869 Ab urbe condita). The denomination 116 for this year has been used since the early medieval period, when the Anno Domini calendar era became the prevalent method in Europe for naming years.

Events 
 By place 

 Roman Empire 
 Emperor Trajan completes his invasion of Parthia by capturing the cities of Seleucia, Babylon, Ctesiphon and Susa, marking the high-water mark of the Roman Empire's eastern expansion.
 Trajan makes Syria a province of Rome and crosses the Tigris to annex Adiabene. He proceeds with his army to the Persian Gulf and conquers territory that becomes the province of Parthia. 
 Trajan removes Osroes I as king of Parthia, and appoints his son Parthamaspates in his place. Parthamaspates Romanizes his name to Parthicus.
 Trajan sends two expeditionary forces. One, consisting of elements of Legio III Cyrenaica, to suppress the revolt in Judea and the other Legio VII Claudia to restore order on Cyprus. 
 Trajan sends laureatae to the Roman Senate on account of his victories and being  conqueror of Parthia. 
 Quintus Marcius Turbo sails to Alexandria and defeats the Jews in several pitched battles. 
 Jewish uprising against Rome fails.

Births 
 Liang Na, wife of Shun of Han (d. 150)

Deaths 
 March 30 – Quirinus of Neuss, Roman Christian martyr according to Roman Catholic tradition
 Abgar VII, ruler of Osroene (approximate date)
 Ban Zhao, female Chinese historian (b. AD 49)
 Philopappos, prince of Commagene (b. AD 65)
 Zacchaeus of Jerusalem, bishop of Jerusalem

References